NBC Europe (formerly Super Channel, and later NBC Channel) was a satellite television network based in the United Kingdom that broadcast across Europe, and it was picked up by various European cable systems where available.

The network was based in the heart of London, 19-22 Rathbone Place in the same building as Music Box, would later become the home of CNN International until 2007. For a number of months, the transmission facilities were provided by Molinare at Fouberts Place, and returned briefly until the Marcucci family acquired Melrose House, 14 Lanark Square in Limeharbour where it set up as a state-of-the-art broadcasting centre.

History

1987–1993: Super Channel

Launched on 30 January 1987, replacing the 24-hour music channel Music Box, it was co-owned by all but one of the ITV companies at the time in the United Kingdom. Virgin Group had a majority stake in Music Box (60%) and would own 15% of the equity with the rest being split between ITV franchise holders including Granada, Yorkshire, LWT, Central, Anglia, Tyne Tees, Ulster, Grampian, Scottish, Border, HTV, TSW and TVS, while Thames and TV-am were the only two of the contractors not to participate. It competed with Sky Channel (forerunner of Sky One), which was the only other major pan-European satellite television network around at the time. Unlike Sky Channel, syndicated output was less American and more European.  Much of its programming was sourced from ITV or the BBC as part of "Best of British", and it also featured ITN-produced news bulletins. It also broadcast syndicated non-British European programmes, including the Dutch sitcom Zeg 'ns Aaa (with English subtitles).

Super Channel fared poorly, due to United Kingdom-based programming seen as unsuitable for European audiences, such as drama being seen as "too violent" or "too realistic", as well as a dispute with the British actors' union who demanded additional fees for viewing by audiences which meant that it could no longer offer the 'Best of British to a European audience'.

Within a year, the ITV companies sold the network to the Italian Marcucci family, owners of Videomusic, the first music channel in Italy, with a minority stake being held by Richard Branson's Virgin plc. The programming changed from British to pan-European, although it continued carrying ITN World News bulletins.

1993–1998: NBC steps in

On 2 October 1993, the station which was in severe financial difficulties was taken over by the American company General Electric, then-parent of the NBC television network, and became NBC Super Channel. From 9 September 1996, the channel was renamed NBC Europe, but was from then on almost always referred to as simply "NBC" on the air, although the network (along with its sister station CNBC Europe launched on 11 March earlier that year) was transmitted from the GE building in Hammersmith. The transmission suite used cutting edge Pro-Bel COMPASS and MAPP automation at the time, and Profile video servers for all commercials and promotions, within programmes continued to be played from tape automatically.

Most of NBC's prime time programming was produced in Europe, but after 10.00pm (CET) on weekday evenings as the channel aired The Tonight Show with Jay Leno, Late Night with Conan O'Brien and Later to hence its slogan "Where the Stars Come Out at Night". Most news programmes were broadcast on NBC Europe including Dateline, Time and Again and NBC Nightly News, which was aired live. The Today Show was also initially shown live in the afternoons, but was later broadcast the following morning instead, by which time it was more than half a day old. This meant that all the NBC News portions had to be replaced with European updates produced by ITN in London, also supplied the network with the main newscasts before and after the GE takeover. European weather forecasts was produced by the BBC at first, but was later taken over by NBC in the United States occasionally.

NBC Europe carried virtually no prime time entertainment programmes shown in the United States, because they were usually owned and distributed by other studios under the fin-syn rules (which did not apply in Europe). NBC would have had to buy the rights for each country in order to show which would have been too expensive. Even for shows that NBC Studios owned itself, it was generally more financially viable to sell the rights by country either to broadcast or cable and satellite channels than to air them on NBC Europe. The most notable exceptions to this rule were brief runs of Profiler and The Pretender, as well as short-lived American sitcoms Union Square and Mr. Rhodes. That is widely considered to be one of the main reasons why NBC Europe was ultimately not a success.

1998–2005: As a German network

NBC Europe stopped broadcasting to most of Europe on 30 June 1998, when the Deutsche Fernsehnachrichten Agentur took it over and moved to Düsseldorf. Most of the satellite feeds became either National Geographic Channel or CNBC. NBC Europe continued to operate on Germany's cable television networks, fed by one digital satellite link from Eutelsat II-F1 (later Hot Bird 5). On 30 November, the first German programming started airing, assembled from content from GIGA and CNBC Europe, as well as other shows. In 2004, NBCUniversal took over the DFA and consequently NBC Europe.

On 29 September 2005, NBC Europe was split into GIGA and later replaced by the new channel Das Vierte. The service continued broadcasting with its licence on cable, satellite, IPTV and digital cable. It broadcast a special version on cable television including CNBC Europe and GIGA (up until 31 March 2006). This was necessary to keep both the licence and the cable channel.

On 25 September 2012, The Walt Disney Company acquired Das Vierte and closed the service from 31 December 2013. On 17 January 2014, the network was replaced by Disney Channel Germany switching from pay television to free-to-air.

Programming
Due to limitations on the amount of entertainment shows on the network, NBC Europe (including GIGA) aired a number of original programming in tandem with American content that had not been aired in Europe beforehand. These include:

 49win
 Agenda
 Best of the Ticket
 Blue Night
 Bonanza
 Business Insiders
 Business Tonight
 Business Weekly
 Chinese News Europe
 CNBC Business Weekly
 CNBC European Squawk Box
 CNBC U.S. Squawk Box
 Dateline
 Daybreak
 The Detectives
 Disaster Chronicles
 Eco Record
 Equal Time
 European Business Today
 Father Murphy
 Film Europe
 FT Business Today
 FT Business Tonight
 FT European Business Today
 GIGA green (later GIGA@ the gate)
 GIGA Games
 GIGA Heartbeat
 Holidays
 Hotline
 Inside Edition
 ITN Super Channel News
 ITN World News
 Kinowelt-De News
 Late Night with Conan O'Brien
 Later
 Mancuso, F.B.I.
 Max's European Home Video Show
 MediaTelevision
 The Mix
 Money Wheel
 European Money Wheel
 U.S. Money Wheel
 Mr. Rhodes
 MSNBC - The Site
 MSNBC Internight Live
 National Geographic
 NBC GIGA
 NBC GIGA Real
 NBC Music Legends
 NBC News Special Reports
 NBC News Today
 NBC Nightly News
 NBC Sports News
 NHL International Weekly
 On the Air
 Personal
 PGA Tour
 The Pretender
 Profiler
 Real Personal
 Riviera
 The Rolonda Watts Show
 Saturday Night Live
 The Selina Scott Show
 Super Channel Documentaries
 Super Channel Sports Specials
 SMS Challenge
 Super Shop
 Talkin' Blues
 Talkin' Jazz
 Time and Again
 The Today Show
 Today's Business
 The Tonight Show with Jay Leno
 Travel Express
 U.S. Market Wrap Up
 Union Square
 Victory
 Videofashion
 West of Moscow
 Young Soul Rebels

See also
 List of European television stations
 Timeline of cable television in the United Kingdom
 Europa TV

References

External links
 Superchannel Launch - Complete and in full
 Uphill Struggle for Pan-Europe Stations : Televising to a Continent article from International Herald Tribune;  16 March 1994
 

History of television in the United Kingdom
Defunct television channels in the United Kingdom
Defunct television channels in Germany
Defunct television channels in the Netherlands
Television channels and stations established in 1987
Television channels and stations disestablished in 1998
Television channels and stations disestablished in 2005
2005 disestablishments in Germany
National Broadcasting Company
Satellite television
1980s in Europe
1980s in British television
1980s in Dutch television
1980s in German television
1990s in Europe
1990s in British television
1990s in Dutch television
1990s in German television
2000s in Europe
2000s in German television